Zaspa-Młyniec is one of the administrative districts of the city of Gdańsk, Poland. The quarter with mainly high buildings has been built on the runways of the former airport of Gdańsk (Lotnisko Gdańsk-Wrzeszcz). Around 1900 there had been the villages Saspe, Mühlenhof and a training area of the Prussian  hussars.

There is an SKM (Rapid City Railway) stop called Gdańsk-Zaspa.

inhabitants: 16,471
area: 1.3  km2
population density 13,144/ km2

See also
 Zaspa
 Zaspa-Rozstaje

External links
 Map of Zaspa-Młyniec

Gdańsk